The Women's National Basketball Association's Most Improved Player Award is an annual Women's National Basketball Association (WNBA) award given since the 2000 WNBA season, to the most improved player of the regular season. The winner is selected by a panel of sportswriters throughout the United States, each of whom casts a vote for first, second and third place selections. Each first-place vote is worth five points; each second-place vote is worth three points; and each third-place vote is worth one point. The player with the highest point total, regardless of the number of first-place votes, wins the award.

In 2019, Leilani Mitchell became the first player in history to win the award twice, after winning the award in 2010. In 2004, there was a tie -- both Kelly Miller and Wendy Palmer received the award. Nicole Powell, Natasha Howard  and Jackie Young (basketball)|Natasha Howard]] are the only players to win the Most Improved award and a WNBA title in the same year.

Winners

Notes
 Leilani Mitchell was born as a dual citizen of the United States and Australia. She represents Australia internationally.
 Kia Vaughn was born in the United States and is a naturalized citizen of the Czech Republic. She has represented the Czech Republic internationally since 2017.
 Kristi Toliver was born in the United States and is a naturalized citizen of Slovakia. She has represented Slovakia internationally since 2014.
 Shavonte Zellous was born in the United States and is a naturalized citizen of Croatia. She has represented Croatia internationally since 2015.
 Elizabeth Williams was born in the United Kingdom and is a naturalized citizen of the United States. She has represented the United States internationally since 2009.
 Jonquel Jones was born in the Bahamas and is a naturalized citizen of Bosnia and Herzegovina. She has represented Bosnia and Herzegovina internationally since 2019.

See also

 List of sports awards honoring women

References

Awards established in 2000
Most Improved
Most improved awards